The article Education in Poland  is about education in modern Poland. For other periods of Polish history, see
Commission of National Education, the origin of public education in Poland, starting in 1773
Education in the Second Polish Republic, education in the interbellum Poland
Education in Poland during World War II, education in occupied Poland during World War II
Education in the Polish People's Republic, education in the Communist Poland